Campbell Village is a small village in Dominica. It is located in the parish of Saint. Paul, near Mahaut Village and is notable for its hidden waterfalls.

Notes

Populated places in Dominica